Kerry Joan Modra  (born 27 November 1973) is an Australian Paralympic tandem cycling pilot. She was born in the New South Wales city of Nowra. She was introduced to Kieran Modra, a visually impaired cyclist, at a friend's 21st birthday party. He convinced her  to take up cycling; she had only played netball before then. She became Modra's pilot, and six months later, she won a gold medal with him at the 1996 Atlanta Games in the Mixed 200 m Sprint Tandem open event, for which she received a Medal of the Order of Australia.

She was married to Modra from May 1997 until his death in 2019, and they had three daughters. As Kieran's pilot at the 1998 UCI Para-cycling Track World Championships in Colorado Springs, she won gold medals in the Mixed Tandem Sprint B, Mixed Tandem Time Trial B and Mixed Individual Pursuit B. At the 2000 Sydney Games, she did not win any medals. At the games, she was pregnant with the couple's first child, and fainted due to low blood pressure during a quarter-final sprint race; she was replaced as Kieran's pilot by his sister Tania for the rest of the games. In 2000, she received an Australian Sports Medal.

References

External links 
 
 
 

1973 births
Living people
Australian female cyclists
Paralympic cyclists of Australia
Paralympic sighted guides
Paralympic gold medalists for Australia
Cyclists at the 1996 Summer Paralympics
Cyclists at the 2000 Summer Paralympics
Medalists at the 1996 Summer Paralympics
Paralympic medalists in cycling
Recipients of the Medal of the Order of Australia
Recipients of the Australian Sports Medal
People from Nowra
Cyclists from New South Wales